Nancy Lang (Korean: 낸시 랭, Korean name: Park Hye-ryeong; Korean: 박혜령; born March 11, 1976) is a Pop artist, performance artist, entrepreneur and television personality. In 2010, she performed as "beggar the queen" in London. Her performances are considered on the fringe of artwork . From October 2012 to 2013, Lang starred Hwang Jung-min and Kim Se-a in The Vagina Monologues. She is CEO of cosmetic shop Laha Korea and Hair brand Lang Shop.

Biography
Nancy went back to Korea in 1996 and went to Hongik University to study western art and gave up her south korean nationality around that time.
In 2003,Nancy lang debuted with her 2003 performance at the Venice biennale titled 'the conflict with uninvited dreams',which was playing a violin in a lingerie.

Publications

External links

References

1970s births
Living people
American pop artists
American women performance artists
American performance artists
American cosmetics businesspeople
American television personalities
American women television personalities
American people of Korean descent
Hongik University alumni
21st-century American women